Gary Schwartz (born June 12, 1940 in Brooklyn) is an American-born Dutch art historian, who is a scholar of Rembrandt and art of the Dutch Golden Age.

Career
A native of East New York, Brooklyn, Schwartz was born to Hungarian mother and a Polish American father, who worked in textile manufacturing. He then moved with his family to Far Rockaway, Queens, at the age of twelve. In 1961, Schwartz received a Bachelor of Arts in Art History from New York University, where he was inspired to study the topic after taking an introductory course by the noted art historian H. W. Janson. Schwartz then continued to Johns Hopkins University, where he completed coursework towards a Doctor of Philosophy in Art History, focusing on medieval art. In 1965, Schwartz moved to the Netherlands to research Dutch Golden Age painting, never to return to the United States and abandoned completing his doctoral degree.

In 1966, Schwartz took up various jobs, including as a translator of Dutch and German texts, an assistant to Jan Gerrit van Gelder at Utrecht University, and editor of the journal Simiolus. Two years later, Schwartz also worked under Horst Gerson editing publications, and married Loekie Hendriks. In 1971, Schwartz established his own publishing firm called "Uitgeverij Gary Schwartz" in Maarssen, in order to print books that were considered important to the field of art from the Dutch Golden Age. Six years later, Schwartz published his first book, which was on the artist Rembrandt, titled Rembrandt: All the Etchings Reproduced in True Size.

Schwartz continued research on Rembrandt, publishing several more books over the years and establishing himself as an expert on the artist. From 1986 to 1987, Schwartz conducted research at the Getty Center, and a year later, sold his publishing firm. However, he continued to work for the company until 1991.

In 1998, Schwartz founded CODART, a digital network for curators of art from the Low Countries. He served as its director until 2005, but continued to work for the network until 2008.

In 2009, Schwartz received the Prins Bernhard Cultuurfonds Prize for the Humanities, a lifetime achievement award.

Select works
Rembrandt: All the Etchings Reproduced in True Size (1977)
Rembrandt: Zijn Leven, Zijn Schilderijen (1984)
Rembrandt: His Life, His Paintings (1985) 
Rembrandt (1992) 
The Complete Etchings of Rembrandt (1994) 
Bets and Scams: A Novel of the Art World (1996) 
The Night Watch (2002) 
The Rembrandt Book (2006) 
Rembrandt's Universe: His Art, His Life, His World (2006) 
Meet Rembrandt: Life and Work of the Master Painter (2011) 
Emotions: Pain and Pleasure in Dutch Painting of the Golden Age (2014)

See also
List of New York University alumni
List of people from Brooklyn
List of Rembrandt connoisseurs and scholars

References

External links
Official website
Dictionary of Art Historians profile

Living people
1940 births
American people of Hungarian descent
American people of Polish descent
People from East New York, Brooklyn
People from Far Rockaway, Queens
New York University alumni
Johns Hopkins University alumni
American art historians
American translators
American expatriate academics
American expatriates in the Netherlands
Rembrandt scholars
Scholars of Dutch art